Cruzy-le-Châtel is a commune in the Yonne department in Bourgogne-Franche-Comté in north-central France.

Historical buildings 
 Château de Maulnes a 16th-century château, classified as a historic monument in 1942. It was opened to the public in 2005 and its restoration work is ongoing.
 Église Saint-Barthélémy de Cruzy-le-Châtel an 18th-century Catholic church, classified as a historic building in 1998.

See also
Communes of the Yonne department

References

Communes of Yonne